Flindersia collina, commonly known as broad-leaved leopard tree, leopard ash, bastard crow's ash or leatherwood, is a species of tree in the family Rutaceae and is endemic to north-eastern Australia. It usually has pinnate leaves with between three and seven elliptical to spatula-shaped leaves, panicles of white flowers and fruit studded with rough points.

Description
Its bark is shed in oval flakes leaving shallow depressions. The leaves are arranged in more or less opposite pairs and are usually pinnate with between three and seven elliptical to egg-shaped leaflets with the narrower end towards the base.

Taxonomy
Flindersia collina was first formally described in 1898 by Frederick Manson Bailey in the Queensland Agricultural Journal.

Distribution and habitat

Conservation status
Flindersia collina is classified as of "least concern" under the Queensland Government Nature Conservation Act 1992.

References

collina
Sapindales of Australia
Flora of New South Wales
Flora of Queensland
Taxa named by Frederick Manson Bailey
Trees of Australia
Plants described in 1898